Chotusice is a municipality and village in Kutná Hora District in the Central Bohemian Region of the Czech Republic. It has about 800 inhabitants.

Administrative parts
The village of Druhanice is an administrative part of Chotusice.

Geography
It lies in a flat agricultural landscape of the Central Elbe Table. The Brslenka Stream flows through the municipality.

History
The first written mention of Chotusice is from 1142 under the name Chotovice. In 1316, it was donated to the Sedlec Abbey. Since the second half of the 14th century, the name of Chotusice is used. The village was devastated during the Hussite Wars in 1421, by the army led by Jan Želivský. From 1436, Chotusice was a part of the Žehušice estate and shared its owners. The village developed significantly in the 16th century and was promoted to a market town in 1601.

Chotusice is known for the nearby Battle of Chotusitz, which was fought in 1742 as part of the First Silesian War.

Sights
The landmark of Chotusice is the Church of Saint Wenceslaus. It was originally a Gothic church from around 1270, extended in 1716. Then it was reconstructed in the Baroque style in 1742, after it was burned down during the Battle of Chotusitz.

References

External links

Villages in Kutná Hora District